Ubaté Province is one of the 15 provinces in the Cundinamarca Department, Colombia.

Etymology 
The name Ubaté comes from the native name "Ebate" meaning "Bloodied land" or "Sower of the mouth".

Subdivision 
The Ubaté Province is subdivided into 10 municipalities:

References 

Provinces of Cundinamarca Department
Province